Yvonne Clarke is a Canadian politician who represents Porter Creek Centre on the Yukon Legislative Assembly from the Yukon Party since the 2021 general election.

Prior to her election to the legislature, she was a businessperson and community volunteer in the Whitehorse area, including serving as president of the Canadian-Filipino Society of the Yukon and chair of the Yukon Advisory Council on Women's Issues.

Life 
Clarke is a Filipino Canadian and has lived in Whitehorse since 1995.

Electoral record

References 

Living people
Yukon Party MLAs
Politicians from Whitehorse
Women MLAs in Yukon
Canadian politicians of Filipino descent
21st-century Canadian women politicians
Year of birth missing (living people)